Fenoxazoline (trade name Aturgyl in Brazil) is a nasal decongestant.

Fenmetozole has the precise same formula, albeit instead of an ortho-isopropyl group, 3',4'-dich was chosen instead.

References

External links

Alpha-adrenergic agonists
Imidazolines
Phenol ethers